Pani Pani Re is a 2016 Hindi-Deccani satire short film produced by Tajalli Productions, written and directed by debutant director Tawseef Quazi. It shows the plight the world would be in, if water isn't conserved. The short film originally released on 19 May 2016, was screened at Lamakaan, Hyderabad. The short is 14 minutes long.

Plot
The story revolves around the family of Nawab Haroon Ali Khan, a rich Nawab who is struggling to find water for his daughter's marriage.

Cast
Mayanand Thakur as Nawab Haroon Ali Khan
Kabeer as Khan Sahab
Rajnish Songara as Rashed
Iqbal Razvi as Rashed's Uncle
Niteesh Malang as Poor man
Akhilesh Washikar as Jafar
Ali Ahmed as Rashed's Friend
Vinay as Nawab's Manager

References 

Indian short films
2016 short films
Films shot in Hyderabad, India